These are the official results of the Men's Shot Put event at the 1982 European Championships in Athens, Greece, held at the Olympic Stadium "Spiros Louis" on 8 and 9 September 1982.

Medalists

Results

Final
9 September

Qualification
8 September

Participation
According to an unofficial count, 20 athletes from 11 countries participated in the event.

 (1)
 (1)
 (3)
 (2)
 (1)
 (3)
 (1)
 (3)
 (2)
 (1)
 (2)

See also
 1980 Men's Olympic Shot Put (Moscow)
 1982 Shot Put Year Ranking
 1983 Men's World Championships Shot Put (Helsinki)
 1984 Men's Olympic Shot Put (Los Angeles)
 1987 Men's World Championships Shot Put (Rome)
 1988 Men's Olympic Shot Put (Seoul)

References

 Results

Shot put
Shot put at the European Athletics Championships